New Netherland  (Nieuw-Nederland in Dutch) was the 17th century colonial province of the Republic of the Seven United Netherlands on the northeastern coast of North America. The claimed territory was the land from the Delmarva Peninsula to southern Cape Cod. The settled areas are now part of the Mid-Atlantic states of New York, New Jersey, and Delaware, with small outposts in Connecticut and Pennsylvania. Its capital of New Amsterdam was located at the southern tip of the island of Manhattan on the Upper New York Bay.

The region was initially explored in 1609 by Henry Hudson on an expedition for the Dutch East India Company. It was later surveyed and charted, and was given its name in 1614. The Dutch named the three main rivers of the province the Zuyd Rivier (South River, now the Delaware River), the Noort Rivier (North River, now the Hudson River), and the Versche Rivier (Fresh River, now the Connecticut River). They intended to use them to gain access to the interior, the indigenous population, and the lucrative fur trade.

International law required discovery, charting, and settlement to perfect a territorial claim. Large scale settlement was rejected in favor of a formula that was working in Asia of establishing factories (trading posts with a military presence and a small support community). This period is sometimes referred to as the Dutch Golden Age, despite on-going wars on the European continent, and it was difficult to recruit people to leave the economic boom and cultural vibrancy of Europe. Mismanagement and under-funding by the Dutch West India Company hindered early settlement, as well as misunderstandings and armed conflict with Indians. Liberalization of trade, a degree of self-rule, and the loss of Dutch Brazil led to exponential growth in the 1650s. Transfers of power from the Netherlands to England were peaceful in the province, the last one formalized in 1674.

Forts and Factorijen

The first of two Forts Nassau was built in Mahican territory during the first decade, where  commerce could be conducted with Indians, and factorijen (small trading posts) went up at Schenectady, Schoharie, Esopus, Quinnipiac, Communipaw, Ninigret, Totoket, Schuykill, and elsewhere. Trapper Jan Rodrigues is believed to have been the first non-Indian to winter on the island of Manhattan in 1613.

Nut Island

The States General of the Dutch Republic awarded the newly formed Dutch West India Company a trade monopoly for the region in 1621, and New Netherland became a province of the Dutch Republic in 1624. The South River was initially chosen as the site of the capital because the colonists felt that it had the best climate. However, summer humidity, mosquitos, and winter freezing made the North River more appealing. A number of ships brought settlers to the New World, at first to Noten Island and soon after to the tip of Manhattan, and the colonists began construction of Fort Amsterdam, around which the colony began to grow. Small groups of the early arrivals were dispersed to Fort Orange, to Fort Wilhelmus, or to Kievets Hoek, but those who went to Fort Wilhelmus and Kievets Hoek were later recalled.  Among those who made the crossing were many Walloons and 11 Africans as company-owned slaves.

Patroonships

In 1629, the Dutch West India Company introduced the Charter of Freedoms and Exemptions, a series of inducements commonly known as the patroon system. Invested members could receive vast land patents and manorial rights, somewhat reminiscent of a feudal lord, if they were willing to fulfill certain conditions, including transporting and settling at least 50 persons. A number of attempts were made, but the only notable success was the Manor of Rensselaerswyck. Pavonia, across the river from New Amsterdam, was returned to the company and became a company-managed holding. In 1640, company policy was changed to allow land purchases by individuals in good standing.

South River

Another patroon patent was Zwaanendael Colony later named by the British, Lewes, Delaware (the town is still known as such), the first Dutch colonial settlement on the Zuyd Rivier (Delaware Bay), but it was plundered soon after its founding in 1631. After 1638, settlement was mostly in New Sweden, and these were brought under New Netherland control in 1655 when Fort Casimir was built. In 1663, Pieter Corneliszoon Plockhoy attempted to create a utopian settlement in the region, but it expired under English rule.

Fresh River (Connecticut)

The Dutch established a short-lived factorij trading post at Kievits Hoek (or Plover's Corner) in present-day Old Saybrook, Connecticut shortly after constructing their first settlement on the island of Manhattan. They abandoned it soon after, however, in order to focus on the trading post at Fort Goede Hoop on the Connecticut River, which was completed in 1633. The Dutch also had a trading post and possible fort at the mouth of the Branford River in Branford, Connecticut, which still contains a wharf called "Dutch Wharf." Soon after, settlers from the Massachusetts Bay Colony formed the Connecticut Colony in 1639, and the New Haven Colony soon followed. Petrus Stuyvesant attempted to prevent further competition for the area and agreed to a border 50 miles west of the river in the Treaty of Hartford (1650). This did not stem the flow of New Englanders to Long Island and the mainland along Long Island Sound, however.

North River

The port called the Manhattans grew up at the mouth of the North River (Hudson River). New Amsterdam was the capital of the province and received its municipal charter in 1652; this included the isle of Manhattan, Staaten Eylandt, Pavonia, and the Lange Eylandt towns, including Gravesend, Breuckelen, and Nieuw Amersfoort.

A municipal charter was also granted to Beverwijck in 1652, which had grown from a trading post to a bustling town in the midst of Rensselaerswyck. In 1657, the homesteads scattered along the west bank of the Hudson Valley in Esopus country were required to build a garrison that became the province's third largest town of Wiltwijk.

The Dutch Belt

Colonial settlers spread throughout the region after the final transfer of power to the English with the Treaty of Westminster (1674), establishing many of the towns and cities that exist today. The Dutch Reformed Church played an important role in this expansion. Settlers followed the course of the Hudson River in the north via New York Harbor to the Raritan River in the south along what George Washington called the "Dutch Belt".

Demographics
Population estimates do not include Native Americans.
 1628: 270
 1630: 300
 1640: 500
 1650: 800 -1,000 
 1664: 9,000

List of settlements

Reformed Congregations pre-1776 (selection)

1683 - New Pfaltz   (Huguenot)
1684 - Sleepy Hollow
1686 - Hackensack
1693 - Acquackanonk in Passaic
1694 - Tappan
1699 - Brick in Marlboro
1700 - Second River in Belleville
1703 - Six Mile Run
1710 - Ponds in Oakland
1716 - Claverack
1716 - Fishkill
1716 - Poughkeepsie
1717 - New Brunswick
1717 - Schaghticoke  
1719 - North Branch
1720 - Fairfield
1723 - Herkimer (German Palatines)
1724 - Schraalenburgh now Dumont
1725 - Paramus
1725 - Stone Arabia in Palatine (German Palatines)
1727 - Harlingen
1731 - Rhinebeck
1736 - Pompton Plains
1740 - Ramapo in Mahwah
1750 - Canajoharie
1750 - Clarkstown
1755 - Totowa   in Paterson
1756 - Schodack
1756 - Montivlle
1758 - Caughnawaga now Fonda
1758 - New Hackensack in Town of Wappinger
1758 - Bedminster
1763 - Betlehem
1765 - Ghent
1770 - English Neighborhood, now Ridgefield
1774 - Kakiat now West New Hempstead
1776 - Hillsdale

See also
Toponymy of New Netherland
New Netherlander
Reformed Church in America
New Brunswick Theological Seminary
Forts of New Netherland
Huguenot Street Historic District
German Palatines
History of Brooklyn
List of Dutch West India Company trading posts and settlements

References

Sources
Dutch Reformed Church Records
History of Dutch Reformed Church
Colonial Maps

NNL chronology

Colonial settlements in North America
New Netherland
History of the Thirteen Colonies
Former Dutch colonies
1614 establishments in the Dutch Empire
1674 disestablishments in the Thirteen Colonies
1674 disestablishments in the Dutch Empire
Populated places established in the 17th century
Dutch-American culture in New Jersey
Dutch-American culture in New York (state)

fr:Établissements et fortifications de Nouvelle-Néerlande